King Street Capital Management is a global investment management company founded in 1995 by Brian J. Higgins and Francis Biondi Jr. King Street Capital Management managed approximately $17.9 billion of assets as of June 2019. Investments include public equity and fixed income markets globally with a focus in special situations credit, equity, bonds, and foreign exchange. Significant investments included Dish Network, PG&E, and Allergan.

References

External links 
 Official website

Financial services companies established in 1995
Hedge fund firms in New York City
Hedge funds